Twinkle Sohail (born: c.1998) is a Pakistani weightlifter.

Personal information 
Her father's name is Sohail Javed Khokhar. She has four sisters including Maryam, Sybil and Veronica all of whom are weightlifters. Throughout her career, she has been coached by Rashid Malik and Muhammad Zahid. She belongs to the Christian community of Pakistan. Sohail is currently pursues a bachelor's program focused in Sports Sciences from University of the Punjab, Lahore.

Career 
Sohail initiated her professional sporting career as a cyclist and later switched to weightlifting as her coach identified special talent in her for this sport.

National
Sohail represents Pakistan Railways in national competitions. In November 2019, she won gold in the 76kg category at the National Games held in Peshawar.

International 
Sohail, with her teammates, Sybil Sohail and Saniha Ghafoor brought a total of 12 gold medals to Pakistan by participating in the International Oceania Pacific Powerlifting Championship held in Singapore in 2017. She has also earned a gold medal in 57th category at Bench Press Competition held in Muscat, Oman. This contest had 148 participants representing 14 different countries. She became the first woman to represent her country in the championship and the first to bring back gold. In December 2019, she along with her younger sister, Veronica, participated in the 13th South Asian Games held in Kathmandu, Nepal.

References 

Living people
Pakistani female weightlifters
Pakistani Christians
1998 births
Pakistani female powerlifters
Pakistani powerlifters